A superhuman is a human being with intelligence or abilities exceeding normal human standards or a being with capabilities that exceed human capacity.

Superhuman or super-human may also refer to:

Philosophy
 Transhumanism, a cultural movement supporting the use of science and technology to improve human characteristics and capacities
 Übermensch, sometimes translated as "Superhuman", a concept of Friedrich Nietzsche

Arts and entertainment

Music
 "Superhuman" (Chris Brown song)
 "Superhuman" (NCT 127 song)
 "Superhuman" (Slander song), a song by Slander featuring Eric Leva
 "Superhuman", a song by Velvet Revolver from Contraband

Television
 Superhuman, is the American title of Chinese-German television game show The Brain
 Stan Lee's Superhumans, documentary television series about superhumans
 Superhuman was also an American game show produced by Fox and broadcast in 2016–2017; see List of programs broadcast by Fox

Other
 Email client software Superhuman
 Superhumanism (or Super Humanism), a late 20th-century art movement promoted by Nicholas Treadwell
 Super-Human, trade paperback of the Ultimates comic book series issues 1-6

See also
 Subhuman (disambiguation)